Campanicola is a genus of spiders in the family Theridiidae. It was first described in 2015 by Yoshida.

Species 
 it contains ten species, found only in Asia:

 Campanicola anguilliformis Li & Liu, 2021 – China
 Campanicola campanulata (Chen, 1993) – China
 Campanicola chitouensis Yoshida, 2015 – Taiwan
 Campanicola falciformis Li & Liu, 2021 – China
 Campanicola ferrumequina (Bösenberg & Strand, 1906) – China, Korea, Japan
 Campanicola formosana Yoshida, 2015 – Taiwan
 Campanicola heteroidea Li & Liu, 2021 – China
 Campanicola tanakai Yoshida, 2015 – Taiwan
 Campanicola tauricornis Li & Liu, 2021 – China (Hainan)
 Campanicola volubilis Li & Liu, 2021 – China

References

Theridiidae
Araneomorphae genera
Spiders of Asia